Parliamentary elections are scheduled to be held in Turkmenistan on 26 March 2023 to elect the 150 members of the Assembly. The elections take place three years after a return to bicameralism. The first elections for the new upper house, the People's Council of Turkmenistan, were held in 2021.

References 

Turkmenistan
Elections in Turkmenistan
Turkmenistan
Parliament